Ovidiu Ștefan Slușariuc (February 7, 1968) in Suceava, is a former Romanian former rugby union football player. He played as a No. 8.

Club career
During his career Slușariuc played for Romanian clubs CSM Suceava and Dinamo București.

International career
Slușariuc gathered 16 caps for Romania, from his debut in 1991 to his last game in 1999. He scored 1 try during his international career, 5 points on aggregate. He was a member of his national side for the 3rd and 4th Rugby World Cups in 1995 and 1999 and played 2 group matches without scoring.

References

External links

1968 births
Living people
Romanian rugby union players
Romania international rugby union players
Rugby union number eights
Sportspeople from Suceava